Jeremiah 'Miah' Burke (born 1897 in Cork, Ireland) was an Irish sportsperson.  He played hurling with his local club Collins and was a member of the Cork senior inter-county team from 1927 until 1929.

Playing career

Inter-county

Burke first came to prominence on the inter-county scene as a member of the Cork team that won a second consecutive Munster title in 1927 with a 5-3 to 3-4 victory over Clare.  It was his first provincial winners' medal.  The subsequent All-Ireland final saw Cork take on Burke's native county of Dublin once again.  Cork fell behind by 2-3 to 0-1 at half-time; however, they fought back in the second-half.  In a team made up of nine members of the Garda Síochána ‘the Dubs’ claimed the victory by 4-8 to 1-3.

In 1928 Cork faced Clare in the Munster final for the second year in-a-row.  That game ended in a draw, however, in the replay Cork triumphed with Burke collecting his second consecutive Munster title.  Cork later defeated Dublin in the All-Ireland semi-final before lining out against Galway in the championship decider.  Galway got a bye into the final without picking up a hurley, however, the game turned into a rout.  A score line of 6-12 to 1-0 gave Cork the victory and gave Burke an All-Ireland winners' medal.

In 1929 Cork retained their provincial dominance for a fourth consecutive year.  A 4-6 to 2-3 defeat of Waterford gave Burke his third Munster title in three provincial campaigns.  The subsequent All-Ireland final was a replay of the previous year’s game as Cork played Galway once again.  Mick Ahern scored a goal for Cork after just 25 seconds to start another rout.  Cork won the day by 4-9 to 1-3 giving Burke his second All-Ireland title.  It was his last appearance with Cork.

References

1897 births
Year of death missing
Cork inter-county hurlers
Hurling goalkeepers
All-Ireland Senior Hurling Championship winners
Collins hurlers